is a Japanese politician who served as the Minister of Reconstruction in Yoshihide Suga's cabinet. A member of the House of Representatives, Hirasawa is a member of the Liberal Democratic Party and is affiliated to the revisionist lobby Nippon Kaigi.

Biography
Hirasawa is a native of the village of Shirakawa, Gifu. He graduated from the University of Tokyo with a Bachelor of Law. As a student, he served for two years as a private tutor to the elementary school-aged Shinzo Abe. He joined the National Police Agency in 1968 and attended Duke University in the United States while in the agency. He retired from the Agency in 1995 with the rank of Senior Commissioner (警視監, Keishi-kan). 

He was elected to the House of Representatives for the first time in 1996.

References 

1945 births
Living people
Duke University alumni
Japanese anti-communists
Japanese police officers
Government ministers of Japan
Liberal Democratic Party (Japan) politicians
Members of the House of Representatives from Tokyo
Politicians from Gifu Prefecture
University of Tokyo alumni
21st-century Japanese politicians
Members of Nippon Kaigi